Biphenyl-2,3-diol 1,2-dioxygenase is an enzyme that catalyzes the chemical reaction

biphenyl-2,3-diol + O2  2-hydroxy-6-oxo-6-phenylhexa-2,4-dienoate + H2O

Thus, the two substrates of this enzyme are biphenyl-2,3-diol and oxygen, whereas its two products are 2-hydroxy-6-oxo-6-phenylhexa-2,4-dienoate and water.

This enzyme belongs to the family of oxidoreductases, specifically those acting on single donors with O2 as oxidant and incorporation of two atoms of oxygen into the substrate (oxygenases). The oxygen incorporated need not be derived from O2.  The systematic name of this enzyme class is biphenyl-2,3-diol:oxygen 1,2-oxidoreductase (decyclizing). Other names in common use include 2,3-dihydroxybiphenyl dioxygenase, and biphenyl-2,3-diol dioxygenase.  This enzyme participates in gamma-hexachlorocyclohexane degradation and biphenyl degradation.

Structural studies

References

 

EC 1.13.11
Enzymes of known structure